HAVE DRILL was the name of a Defense Intelligence Agency project whose purpose was to evaluate and exploit a MiG-17 "Fresco" that the United States Air Force acquired in 1968 from Israel. Israel acquired the aircraft when a Syrian Air Force pilot mistakenly landed the plane at Israel's northern Betzet airstrip, believing it was in Lebanon. Prior to the end of 1968 this MiG-17 was transferred from Israeli stocks to the US Tactical Fighter Weapons Center Area 51 test fleet. It was given USAF designations and fake serial numbers so that it could be identified in DOD standard flight logs.

The aircraft was originally a Lim-5 (Polish variant of the MiG-17) serial number 1C-07-18, built in Poland in 1956-57. 

The goal of the program was to determine the effectiveness of existing tactics employed by US aircraft and identify the MiG-17's limitations which could then be exploited through the development of tactical techniques.

As in the earlier HAVE DOUGHNUT program, a small group of Air Force and Navy pilots conducted mock dogfights with the MiG-17s. Selected instructors from the Navy's Top Gun school at NAS Miramar, California, were chosen to fly against the MiGs for familiarization purposes. 

The data from the HAVE DOUGHNUT and HAVE DRILL tests were provided to the newly formed United States Navy Fighter Weapons School "Top Gun" school at NAS Miramar and to the USAF Fighter Weapons School. By 1970, the HAVE DRILL program was expanded; a few selected fleet F-4 crews were given the chance to fight the MiGs. The HAVE DRILL dogfights were by invitation only. The other pilots based at Nellis Air Force Base were not to know about the U.S.-operated MiGs. To prevent any sightings, the airspace above the Groom Lake range was closed. On aeronautical maps, the exercise area was marked in red ink. The forbidden zone became known as "Red Square".

Results and recommendations
The results of the program were somewhat surprising. No Navy pilot who flew in the project defeated the MiG-17 Fresco in the first engagement. The MiG-17 was a relatively old design, considered by many US pilots outdated, yet its great maneuverability, especially at low altitudes, showed it could defeat all current US navy aircraft. One of the recommendations of the Navy evaluation was that its A-6, A-7 and A-4 aircraft not engage the MiG-17. However, the flights also revealed the MiG-17's shortcomings. It had an extremely simple, even crude, control system which lacked the power-boosted controls of American aircraft. As compared to the  USAF's and Navy F-4, the  latter's twin engines were so powerful it could accelerate out of range of the MiG-17's guns in thirty seconds. It was important for the F-4 to keep its distance from the MiG-17. As long as the F-4 was one and a half miles from the MiG-17, it was outside the reach of the Soviet fighter's guns, but the MiG was within reach of the F-4's missiles. The Navy subsequently revised its tactics, and during the remainder of the Vietnam War, the Navy kill ratio vs. the MiG-17 climbed to 8.33 to 1 (from an earlier 2.75 to 1 rate).

The existence of the program was secret for many years, until it was declassified in 2013.

References

United States naval aviation
United States intelligence operations
Israel–United States military relations